Frank Harris (1856–1931) was an editor, journalist and publisher.

Frank Harris may also refer to:
Frank Harris (baseball) (1858–1939), infielder in Major League Baseball
Frank Harris (quarterback, born 1948), former American football player 
Frank Harris (quarterback, born 1999), current American college football player
Frank Harris (running back) (born 1964), American football player
Frank Harris (director), director and cinematographer
Frank Harris (footballer, born 1899) (1899–1983), English football full back
Frank Harris (cricketer) (1907–1936), English cricketer
Frank Clifford Harris (1875–1949), British lyricist
Frank Gaines Harris (1871–1944), Democratic politician from the state of Missouri
Francis Harris or Frank Harris (born 1908), English footballer
Frank Harris (Australian footballer) (1883–1961), Australian rules footballer
Detective Frank Harris, a character in Cool World

See also
Franco Harris (born 1950), former American football player
Franklin S. Harris (1884–1960), president of Brigham Young University and Utah State University